Gmund am Tegernsee is a municipality in the district of Miesbach in Bavaria in Germany. The town is located on the north shore of the Tegernsee Lake, and near the source of River Mangfall.

Famous personalities who lived in Gmund were the Federal Chancellor of the Federal Republic of Germany Ludwig Erhard, who is buried in Gmund's cemetery, the architect Sep Ruf and the clockmaker Johann Mannhardt. Reichsführer Heinrich Himmler and his family maintained a home there from 1934 to 1945.

Gmund is served by a station on the privately owned Tegernsee-Bahn railway, and is linked to Munich by through trains of the Bayerische Oberlandbahn.

References

Miesbach (district)